Synecdoche impunctata is a species of achilid planthopper in the family Achilidae.

References

Further reading

External links

 

Insects described in 1851
Achilidae